Lansing High School is a public high school in Lansing, New York, United States. The school is located on the eastern shore of Cayuga Lake in the Finger Lakes region of Upstate New York, approximately nine miles from Ithaca.
 
Lansing High School has an enrollment of approximately 375 students, with slightly under one hundred students in each graduating class. The school district consists of one high school, one middle school, and one elementary school.

Lansing High School's colors are blue and gold, and the school mascot is the bobcat, otherwise known as the Lansing Bobcats.

Academics
Lansing High School offers Advanced Placement Courses, which include: Art, Biology, Calculus AB, Computer Science, English, French, Music Theory I, Spanish, and Statistics.

Lansing High School follows the New York State Public School's graduation requirements. Students can receive a local diploma, a regents diploma, or a regents diploma with advanced designation.

Athletics
In 2000, Shawn Costello won the New York State High School Golf Championship.
In 2001, Girls Varsity Basketball won the New York State High School Basketball Championship.
In 2005 and 2007, John Duthie won the New York State High School Golf Championship.
In 2012, Connor Lapresi won the New York State High School Wrestling Championship (132 lb.).
In 2012, Boys Varsity Baseball won the New York State High School Baseball Championship with a 26-0 record.
In 2017 and 2018, Boys Varsity Soccer won the New York State High School Soccer Championship.

Music
Lansing High School has a mixed chorus, a varsity chorale, a band, an orchestra, a symphony orchestra, and various a cappella groups that are student run.

Notable alumni
Kyle Dake, freestyle wrestler and Olympic bronze medalist
Tim DeKay, actor and star of the USA Network comedy-drama White Collar
Norman E. Snyder Jr., entrepreneur, philanthropist, and former chief operating officer at SoBe 
Christopher Woodrow, entrepreneur, financier, and movie producer (Birdman,  Black Mass, Hacksaw Ridge)

References

Public high schools in New York (state)
Schools in Tompkins County, New York